Maksym Ihorovych Tsvirenko (born 6 December 1998) is a professional Ukrainian footballer who plays as a centre-back for Hirnyk-Sport Horishni Plavni.

References

External links

1998 births
Living people
Footballers from Kharkiv
Ukrainian First League players
Ukrainian Second League players
FC Metalist 1925 Kharkiv players
FC Trostianets players
FC Hirnyk-Sport Horishni Plavni players
Association football defenders
Ukrainian footballers